Maria Raggi di Scio (1552–1600) was a Catholic nun from the island of Chios. Italian artist Gian Lorenzo Bernini in 1647, depicted her in a sculpture which resides on a nave of Santa Maria sopra Minerva church in Rome.

Life 
Maria was born in Chios to a Catholic family, when the island was still part of the Republic of Genoa. She was forced to marry at an early age and after the capture of Chios by the Turks in 1566, her husband was killed by Turkish forces in 1570. After she was widowed she decided to become a nun in 1571, and later on departed for Rome in 1584, where she was offered hospitality at the Palazzo by the de Marini family, near Santa Maria sopra Minerva. An extremely pious woman, she spent much of her day in prayer, and reportedly continually performed miracles. After dying in 1600, there was some possibility of her being canonised, but the general antipathy of Pope Urban VIII to such events meant the opportunity passed.

See also
 Memorial to Maria Raggi

References 

1552 births
1600 deaths
People from Chios
16th-century Italian Roman Catholic religious sisters and nuns